"Roly-Poly" is a disco song by South Korean girl group T-ara. It was taken from their second mini album John Travolta Wannabe, released on 29 June 2011. The song was written and produced by Shinsadong Tiger and Choi Kyu Sung, who were also behind the group's 2009 song "Bo Peep Bo Peep". "Roly-Poly" won three weekly #1 awards on Mnet's M! Countdown and SBS's Inkigayo and went on to become the top grossing and most-downloaded song of 2011. Only a month after release, the song accumulated a record-breaking $3 million in sales with nearly $300 thousand per day. and over 4,000,000 units in digital downloads—the highest figure for a K-pop girl group single on the Gaon Digital Chart in the 2010s.

Background and release

Roly Poly 
"Roly Poly" was released on 29 June 2011, as the lead single of T-ara's John Travolta Wannabe with 3 different music videos, a short dance version, a long drama version and special version made by CCM that compiled several covers of the song from fans around the world and was titled "Roly Poly Version 3". The song was revealed to be viewed in over 70 countries.

Roly Poly in Copacabana 
A remix of the song titled "Roly-Poly in Copacabana" was released on 2 August and was used for the group's follow up promotions. In 2012, The song was re-released in Japanese on 29 February 2012, as the group's third single. Stereogum ranked the music video of the song No. 12 on its list of 20 Best K-pop videos. It was named the fourth best K-pop song by Edge Media.

Roly Poly Japanese version 
The song was re-released in Japanese on 29 February 2012, as the group's third single in the Japanese market. The single peaked at 3 on Oricon and at 5 on Billboard Japan Hot 100.

Critical reception 
Since its release, the song has received positive reviews from critics. The song was listed among the best hit songs of the last decade and of all time by multiple local and international publications.

Chinese media Sina Music described Roly Poly as the most dazzling retro dance music recently, "and it has the strength to bring the retro style back again".

In 2021, Gabriela Caeli Sumampow of Vice included Roly Poly in her "bubbly K-pop" guide on "The Guide to Getting Into K-Pop, South Korea’s Record-Breaking Pop Music". PopMatters gave Roly Poly a positive review along with giving it credit to bringing disco to Kpop; "Its success propelled (or coincided with) the start of a disco trend in K-pop, as heard later in songs like Dal Shabet’s “Bling Bling” (2011) and Nine Muses’s “Figaro” (2011)". The magazine also selected the song as "one of the catchiest K-pop songs ever made".

Commercial performance 
On the Gaon Digital Chart dated 26 June 2011, "Roly-Poly" debuted at number three, before descending to number eight the week after. On its third week it bounced back to number two, the song's peak on the chart. "Roly-Poly" managed to hold at the runner-up slot for two more weeks (stuck behind three different songs nonetheless), before descending down the chart. Despite never topping the weekly or monthly chart and having a little less than half a year to chart, "Roly-Poly" managed to become the best-performing song of the year on the Gaon Digital Chart.

Impact and legacy 
Since its release, "Roly Poly" achieved nationwide popularity due to its retro influences and outfits. The song's popularity spread with T-ara's constant promotion overseas. Since then, the song has been played in several TV Series and films, TV series and used in campaigns and parades. It is also usually covered by rookie groups ahead of their debut as a representative song of the 2010s. Multiple K-pop artists including Oh My Girl, Itzy, Wanna One, MAMAMOO, Davichi, Stayc, IZ*ONE, DONGKIZ covered the song on different occasions.

The song received two musical adaptations in 2012 called "My Youth is Roly Poly". On 24 December 2012, Gag concert members Park Ji-sun, Jang Do-yeon, Oh Na-mi, Kim Min-kyung, Park Na-rae, Heo Min, Park So-young, Heo Anna and Ahn So-mi covered the song on 2011 KBS Entertainment Awards.

In September 2012, popular comedian Kim Shin-Young performed a parody of the song on MBC's "World-Changing Quiz" on Chuseok special episode which gathered attention for the unique stage presented by the comedian.

In 2012, "Roly Poly" was used as a representative political campaign song by the Saenuri Party ahead of the 19th general election of South Korea.

In late June 2017, South Korean girl group G-reyish released a new song named "ohnny GoGo" using the same disco style of the 1980s and modern pop music elements. In an interview with "FN News", the group said "T-ara presented the concept of retro after going through many activities [...] we hope that we can present a retro style as soon as we debut, so that fans can be impressed by us in the future". Member Yena Jung also said, "It's something I'm grateful for just being mentioned with T-ara.".

On 17 May 2019, the song was covered by a group of female university professors called "SSAM" at the '28th Gamatbee University Festival'. The event was held at Gumi University.

In May 2021, during their release showcase, girl group Rocket Punch revealed that they took Roly Poly and its performances as an influence for their newest 80s inspired album "RING RING", “If you look at the stages, there are many things we can imitate from the props and gestures.”

In popular culture 
"Roly Poly" appeared on multiple South Korean and international television series and films since its release including in the first episode of the KBS TV Series Dream High 2 in 2012. The song was also played in the 2011 horror movie Gisang Spirit.

In 2017, the song was played on the 7th episode of the KBS Drama Manhole. It was also played on the 5th episode of the 2020 SBS Drama Backstreet Rookie in a form of karaoke. In 2021, it was played in the first episode of the webtoon-based drama Work Later, Drink Now.

Our Youth, Roly Poly 

"Roly-Poly" was made into a stage musical starring T-ara's Hyomin, Jiyeon and Soyeon, Kang Min-kyung (Davichi), Jang Hye-jin (I Am a Singer), veteran musical actress Park Hae-mi, Han Ji-sub, Kim Jae-hee and Yoon Young-joon.

The first press conference for the musical was held on 4 January at the Seoul Press Center.

Due to the success of the musical, another one was produced and premiered on 2 May 2012. However, the T-ara members did not participate in it due to their busy schedules.

Track listing

Charts

Korean version

Weekly charts

Year-end charts

Japanese version

Accolades

Awards and nominations

Music programs trophies

Lists

Sales

References

2011 songs
2011 singles
2012 singles
T-ara songs
Korean-language songs
Japanese-language songs
Songs written by Shinsadong Tiger
Song recordings produced by Shinsadong Tiger
Songs with lyrics by Shoko Fujibayashi
Billboard Korea K-Pop number-one singles